Quaternary Science Reviews is a peer-reviewed scientific journal covering quaternary science. It was established in 1982 by Pergamon Press and is currently published by Elsevier. The editor-in-chief is C.V. Murray Wallace (University of Wollongong). According to the Journal Citation Reports, the journal has a 2013 impact factor of 4.571.

References

External links 

 

Elsevier academic journals
Biweekly journals
English-language journals
Publications established in 1982
Quaternary science journals
Archaeology journals